Live & Rare is a compilation album by American nu metal band Korn, released on May 9, 2006. It features 13 tracks: all seven from the DVD featuring 2003's CBGB show in New York, which are found on special editions of Greatest Hits Vol. 1, two from Woodstock 1999, three cover songs (one a hidden track from Follow the Leader and another a hidden track from Take a Look in the Mirror), and "Proud", taken from the I Know What You Did Last Summer soundtrack.

The compilation was released after Korn left Epic Records, so it is likely the band had no contributions to the track listing. Also, there is no new material on this album, and most of the tracks are available on other releases, thus sales of the compilation were disappointing.

As of May 31, 2006, it has sold nearly 52,000 total copies in the United States.

Track listing

Japanese edition bonus tracks

Additional notes 

Tracks 1–7:
Recorded live at CBGB, New York City, 11/24/2003
Mixed by Frank Filipetti
Additional mixing by Warren Huart

Track 8:
Live at Projekt Revolution
Recorded live at UMB Bank Pavilion, Maryland Heights, MO, 08/25/2004
Engineered by John Van Eaten
Live sound: Bill Sheppell
Mixed by Tim Harkins at NRG Studios, North Hollywood, CD

Track 9:
Hidden track originally from the Immortal/Epic release of Take a Look in the Mirror
Recorded live on 05/03/2003 at Universal Studios, Universal City, CA
Taken from "MTV ICON: Metallica"
Used with permission by MTV: Music Television

Tracks 10 and 11:
Produced by Mitch Maketansky
Recorded live at Woodstock '99 by Dave Thoener, Rome, NY, July 23, 1999
Mixed by John X at The Record Plant, NYC

Track 12:
Hidden track originally appearing on the Immortal/Epic release of Follow the Leader
Produced by Steve Thompson, Toby Wright & Korn
Recorded by Toby Wright at NRG Recording, North Hollywood, CA
Additional Recording: John Ewing Jr.
Assisted by: John Ewing Jr.
Mixed by Brendan O'Brien at Southern Tracks Studio, Atlanta, GA

Track 13:
Taken from the Columbia release of I Know What You Did Last Summer
Produced by Ross Robinson
Mastered by Stephen Marcussen
Digitally edited by Stewart Whitmore for Marcussen Mastering, Hollywood, CA

Chart positions

References 

2006 compilation albums
2006 live albums
Epic Records compilation albums
Epic Records live albums
Korn compilation albums
Albums recorded at CBGB
Sony BMG compilation albums
Immortal Records albums